The Americas Zone is one of the three zones of regional Davis Cup competition in 2012.

In the Americas Zone in 2012 there are three different groups in which teams compete against each other to advance to the next group, as Groups III and IV have been merged.

Participating nations

Format
The teams will be split into two groups, playing a round-robin, with the winner of each group playing the runner-up of the other group for promotion to Division II in 2013.

It will played on the week commencing 18 June 2012 at Tobago, Trinidad and Tobago and it will be played on outdoor hard court.

Group A

Guatemala vs. Haiti

Trinidad and Tobago vs. Aruba

Aruba vs. Honduras

Trinidad and Tobago vs. Guatemala

Aruba vs. Haiti

Trinidad and Tobago vs. Honduras

Guatemala vs. Honduras

Trinidad and Tobago vs. Haiti

Guatemala vs. Aruba

Haiti vs. Honduras

Group B

Bahamas vs. U.S. Virgin Islands

Costa Rica vs. Jamaica

Bahamas vs. Panama

Costa Rica vs. U.S. Virgin Islands

Bahamas vs. Jamaica

Panama vs. U.S. Virgin Islands

Costa Rica vs. Panama

Jamaica vs. U.S. Virgin Islands

Costa Rica vs. Bahamas

Jamaica vs. Panama

Promotion play-off

Guatemala vs. Costa Rica

Haiti vs. Bahamas

References

External links
Official website

Americas Zone Group III
Davis Cup Americas Zone